Events from the year 1985 in Canada.

Incumbents

Crown 
 Monarch – Elizabeth II

Federal government 
 Governor General – Jeanne Sauvé
 Prime Minister – Brian Mulroney
 Chief Justice – Brian Dickson (Manitoba)
 Parliament – 33rd

Provincial governments

Lieutenant governors 
Lieutenant Governor of Alberta – Francis Charles Lynch-Staunton (until January 22) then Helen Hunley   
Lieutenant Governor of British Columbia – Robert Gordon Rogers 
Lieutenant Governor of Manitoba – Pearl McGonigal 
Lieutenant Governor of New Brunswick – George Stanley 
Lieutenant Governor of Newfoundland – William Anthony Paddon 
Lieutenant Governor of Nova Scotia – Alan Abraham 
Lieutenant Governor of Ontario – John Black Aird (until September 20) then Lincoln Alexander 
Lieutenant Governor of Prince Edward Island – Joseph Aubin Doiron (until August 1) then Lloyd MacPhail 
Lieutenant Governor of Quebec – Gilles Lamontagne 
Lieutenant Governor of Saskatchewan – Frederick Johnson

Premiers 
Premier of Alberta – Peter Lougheed (until November 1) then Don Getty  
Premier of British Columbia – Bill Bennett 
Premier of Manitoba – Howard Pawley 
Premier of New Brunswick – Richard Hatfield
Premier of Newfoundland – Brian Peckford 
Premier of Nova Scotia – John Buchanan 
Premier of Ontario – Bill Davis (until February 8) then Frank Miller (February 8 to June 26) then David Peterson 
Premier of Prince Edward Island – James Lee 
Premier of Quebec – René Lévesque (until October 3) then Pierre-Marc Johnson (October 3 to December 12) then Robert Bourassa 
Premier of Saskatchewan – Grant Devine

Territorial governments

Commissioners 
 Commissioner of Yukon –  Douglas Bell
 Commissioner of Northwest Territories – John Havelock Parker

Premiers 
Premier of the Northwest Territories – Richard Nerysoo (until November 5) then Nick Sibbeston 
Premier of Yukon – Chris Pearson (until March 23) then Willard Phelps (March 23 to May 29) then Tony Penikett

Events

January to March
 January 26 – Frank Miller elected leader of the Ontario Progressive Conservative Party replacing Bill Davis.
 January 30 – The federal government relaxes laws requiring businesses to use the metric system.
 February 8 – Frank Miller becomes premier of Ontario, replacing Bill Davis after the Ontario Progressive Conservative leadership election.
 February 11 – The federal and Newfoundland governments sign the Atlantic Accord paving the way for joint development of Newfoundland's offshore oil and gas reserves.
 February 12 – Minister of National Defence Robert Coates resigns after it is revealed that he visited a strip-club while on government business in Germany.
 February 13 – Denis Lortie is found guilty of murder for his attack at the Quebec Parliament Building that killed three.
 February 28 – Holocaust denier Ernst Zündel is found guilty of publishing false news and fomenting racial intolerance.
 March – Willard Phelps becomes premier of Yukon, replacing Chris Pearson.
 March – At the so-called Shamrock Summit between Prime Minister Mulroney and US President Ronald Reagan the two agree on cooperation on missile defence and free trade.
 March 12 – Heavily armed Armenian militants storm the Turkish embassy in Ottawa. They kill a security guard and hold a dozen people hostage for four hours.
 March 21 – Rick Hansen launches his Man in Motion world tour to raise money for spinal cord research.
 March 29 – 10 are killed after two military planes collide near CFB Edmonton.

April to June
 April 24 - The Supreme Court of Canada rules the Lord's Day Act violates Canadians' freedom of religion.
 May - Tony Penikett becomes government leader of Yukon, replacing Willard Phelps.
 May 2 - Ontario election: Frank Miller's PCs win a minority, but David Peterson's Liberals will form a coalition with the NDP, forcing Miller to resign.
 May 9 - The Supreme Court rules that orders in council are subject to the Canadian Charter of Rights and Freedoms.
 May 31 - A tornado in Barrie, Ontario, kills twelve as part of the 1985 United States–Canada tornado outbreak.
 June 20 – René Lévesque announces his intention to resign as premier of Quebec.
 June 23 - Air India Flight 182 explodes  from Montreal to London; Sikh terrorists are blamed.
 June 26 - David Peterson becomes premier of Ontario, replacing Frank Miller.

July to December
 July 1 - The first cell phone call is made in Canada, between Toronto mayor Art Eggleton and Montreal mayor Jean Drapeau.
 September 1 - The wreck of the RMS Titanic is found off the coast of Newfoundland.
 September 6 - The Canadian Encyclopedia is launched.
 September 17 - The Tunagate scandal erupts.
 September 20 - Lincoln Alexander becomes the Lieutenant-Governor of Ontario, the first Black person to hold a vice-regal position in Canada.
 September 25 - The Royal Tyrrell Museum of Palaeontology opens in Drumheller, Alberta.
 October 3 - Pierre-Marc Johnson becomes premier of Quebec, replacing René Lévesque.
 November 1 - Don Getty becomes premier of Alberta, replacing Peter Lougheed.
 November 5 - Nick Sibbeston becomes government leader of the Northwest Territories, replacing Richard Nerysoo.
 December 2 - In the Quebec election, Robert Bourassa's Liberals gain a majority, defeating the Parti Québécois.
 December 12 - Robert Bourassa becomes premier of Quebec for the second time, replacing Pierre-Marc Johnson.
 December 12 - The worst airplane accident in Canadian history occurs when Arrow Air Flight 1285 crashes on take-off from Gander International Airport; 256 people are killed.
 December 23 - Nahanni earthquake, largest of a number earthquakes occurs in Nahanni region of NWT.
 Corel is founded in Ottawa.

Unknown
 The Mulroney government establishes the Court Challenges Program.

Arts and literature

New books
 Margaret Atwood: The Handmaid's Tale
 Colin Thatcher: Backrooms: A Story of Politics
 Brian Moore: Black Robe
 Erín Moure: Domestic Fuel
 Farley Mowat: My Discovery of America

Awards
 See 1985 Governor General's Awards for a complete list of winners and finalists for those awards.
 Books in Canada First Novel Award: G. Ursell, Perdue, or How the West Was Lost
 Gerald Lampert Award: Paulette Jiles, Celestial Navigation
 Pat Lowther Award: Paulette Jiles, Celestial Navigation
 Stephen Leacock Award: Ted Allan, Love Is a Long Shot
 Vicky Metcalf Award: Edith Fowke

Television
 The last episode of The Friendly Giant on CBC Television
 The first episode of the children's series The Raccoons on CBC Television

Music
 February 10 - A supergroup of Canadian musicians, Northern Lights, gathers to record the charity single Tears Are Not Enough for famine relief in Ethiopia.

Sport
May 18 – Prince Albert Raiders win their only Memorial Cup by defeating the Shawinigan Cataractes 6 to 2. The final game was played at the Cataractes' Shawinigan Municipal Auditorium in Shawinigan, Quebec.
May 30 – Edmonton Oilers win their second (consecutive) Stanley Cup by defeating the Philadelphia Flyers 4 games to 1. The deciding Game 5 was played at Northlands Coliseum in Edmonton. Brantford, Ontario's Wayne Gretzky is awarded the Conn Smythe Trophy
November 24 – BC Lions win their second (and first since 1964) Grey Cup by defeating  the Hamilton Tiger-Cats 37 to 24 in the 73rd Grey Cup played at Olympic Stadium in Montreal
November 30 – Calgary Dinos win their second (consecutive) Vanier Cup by defeating the Western Ontario Mustangs 25 to 6 in the 21st Vanier Cup played at Varsity Stadium in Toronto

Births
 January 1 – Jeff Carter, ice hockey player
 January 3 – Leah Gibson, film actress
 January 4 
Danielle Campo, swimmer
Robbie Dixon, skier
 January 6 – Nathan McIver, ice hockey player
 January 14 – Katie Thorlakson, soccer player
 January 27 – Eric Radford, pair skater
 January 30 – Torrey Mitchell, ice hockey player
 February 7 – Tegan Moss, actress
 February 11 – Mike Richards, ice hockey player
 February 18 –  Chelsea Hobbs, actress and singer
 February 27 – Braydon Coburn, ice hockey player
 February 28 – Fefe Dobson, singer and songwriter
 March 9 – Brent Burns, ice hockey player 
 March 11 – Paul Bissonnette, ice hockey player
 March 25 – Carmen Rasmusen, singer
 April 6 
 Clarke MacArthur, ice hockey player
 Al Mukadam, actor, director, and producer
 April 9 – Brian Elliott, ice hockey goaltender
 April 10
 Christie Laing, actress
 Dion Phaneuf, NHL hockey player
 April 14 – Grant Clitsome, ice hockey player
 April 19 – Sabrina Jalees, comedian, dancer, actress, presenter, and writer 
 April 23 – Rachel Skarsten, actress 
 May 6 – Lewis Hilsenteger, youtuber 
 May 15 – Tyrone Savage, actor
 May 22 – Marc-Antoine Pouliot, ice hockey player  
 May 27 – Andrew Francis, voice actor and actor
 June 10 – Kreesha Turner, singer-songwriter and dancer
 June 13 – Danny Syvret, ice hockey player 
 June 22 – Douglas Smith, actor
 June 23 – Holly Lincoln, football (soccer) player
 June 24 – Isabelle Rampling, synchronized swimmer
 July 1 – Nineteen85, hip-hop producer
 July 5 – Michael Cuccione, child actor and activist (d. 2001)
 July 6 – Diamond Rings, singer-songwriter, guitarist, and producer 
 July 12 
 Adam Gregory, singer 
 Theo Tams, singer-songwriter, pianist & keyboardist
 July 16
 Matthew Santoro, youtuber
 Vanessa Meloche, artistic gymnast
 July 20 – Harley Morenstein, actor and internet personality
 July 21 – Vanessa Lengies, actress, dancer, and singer
 July 23 – Tessa Bonhomme, hockey player
 August 7 – Rick Genest, artist, actor, and fashion model (d. 2018) 
 July 28 – Dustin Milligan, actor
 August 26 – Sean Denison, basketball player
 September 2 – Yani Gellman, Canadian/Australian film and television actor  
 September 8 – Justin Bradley, actor
 September 10 – Elyse Levesque, actress
 September 19 – Renee Young, journalist
 September 22 – Tatiana Maslany, actress
 September 24 – Jessica Lucas, actress and singer
 September 27 – Massimo Bertocchi, decathlete
 October 1 – Leah Renee Cudmore, actress and singer 
 October 8 – Magda Apanowicz, actress
 October 22 – Mitch MacDonald, singer & guitarist
 November 11 – Kalan Porter, singer-songwriter
 November 21 – Carly Rae Jepsen, singer and songwriter
 December 8 – Meagan Duhamel, pair skater

Deaths

January to June
 January 30 – F. R. Scott, poet, intellectual and constitutional expert (b. 1899)
 February 2 – Micheline Coulombe Saint-Marcoux, musician and composer (b. 1938)
 February 5 – Georges-Émile Lapalme, politician (b. 1907)
 February 16 – Marian Engel, novelist (b. 1933)
 March 17 – Athole Shearer, actress (b. 1900)
 April 17 – Walter Weir, politician and 15th Premier of Manitoba (b. 1929)
 April 21 – Foster Hewitt, radio pioneer (b. 1902)
 April 22 – Jacques Ferron, physician and author, founder of the Parti Rhinocéros (b. 1921)

July to December
 July 3 – Frank J. Selke, ice hockey manager (b. 1893)
 August 20 – Donald O. Hebb, psychologist (b. 1904)
 September 6 – Isabel Meighen, wife of Arthur Meighen, 9th Prime Minister of Canada (b. 1883)
 October 28 – Eric Coy, discus thrower and shot putter (b. 1914)

Full date unknown
June – Kenneth Zeller, teacher and librarian (b. 1945)

See also
 1985 in Canadian television
 List of Canadian films of 1985

References

 
Years of the 20th century in Canada
Canada
1985 in North America